Awfis is an Indian company that offers co-working spaces to the startups, freelancers and entrepreneurial communities. It was founded in 2015 and has more than 88,000 seats in 150 centers across India.

History 
Awfis was founded by Amit Ramani in April 2015 with 8 centers. It introduced a mobile app that enables the users to book office and meeting spaces in its centers across the country.

The first Awfis center opened in April in Delhi. As of March 2016, it had 4,000 seats across Delhi, Mumbai, and Bangalore.

In October 2016, Awfis started the first out of a van Mobile office in New Delhi with the options of Wi-Fi, teleconferencing, a printer, meeting table, pantry, and others.

Awfis provides meeting rooms on rent within luxury hotels like Trident, Lemon Tree, Marine Plaza, and Sarovar & Hyatt across multiple cities.

In August 2019, Awfis raised $30 million in Series D funding led by ChrysCapital.

On 21 Jan 2021, Tesla India books one-seat office in Awfis Bengaluru.

In February 2021, Realty Firm Prestige Group has tied up with Awfis to set-up six coworking spaces of around 4,000 seats in Bengaluru, Hyderabad and Chennai which will be operational between April and July in 2021.

In 2022, Awfis is planning to launch its own IPO.

Operations 
Currently, Awfis operates in NCR, Delhi, Noida, Gurgaon, Mumbai, Pune, Bengaluru, Hyderabad, Kolkata, Chandigarh, Ahmedabad, Chennai Bhubaneswar Indore with upcoming centers in Jaipur, Lucknow

Recognition 
In December 2016, Awfis was featured under the 40 coolest co-working spaces in India published in the Entrepreneur magazine.

References

Companies based in Delhi
Coworking space providers
Real estate companies established in 2015
2015 establishments in Delhi